The 1974 All-Ireland Senior Camogie Championship was the high point of the 1974 season. The championship was won by Kilkenny who defeated Cork by a four-point margin in the final for a historic first success. The match was replayed, the third time this had happened in a final in the history of camogie.

Open Draw
This was the first championship to be held under the open draw. Maol Muire Tynan later to become a prominent journalist, played in goal as Kilkenny defeated Tipperary| 1–7 to 1–1 in the new open draw quarter-final at Gowran. Tipperary failed to score in the second half as Carmel Doyle scored Kilkenny’s goal. Galway kept some of their more prominent players for the junior team but put up a surprisingly good show against Cork.

Semi-finals
Kilkenny needed a last-minute point from a free by Helena O'Neill in the semi-final at Wexford Park. Cork had a somewhat fortuitous first round victory over Galway but looked a team of champions when defeating Antrim in the semi-final.

Final
Kilkenny were lucky to draw the final against Cork at Croke Park on 15 September with the last puck of the match from Helena O'Neill from an acute angle. Cork had first half goals from Marion McCarthy, Nancy O'Driscoll and Marion Sweeney goaled for Cork in the first-half while Carmel Doyle and Angela Downey replied for Kilkenny.Agnes Hourigan wrote in the Irish Press: This was one of the great finals in which the skills displayed by the Cork and Kilkenny hurlers were often evident. The high standard of play, the speed of the layers, and the accuracy of the free-takers all combined to make this a memorable game. Both sides missed chances but the Kilkenny attack muffed one opportunity towards the end that would probably have given them the title.

Replay
Kilkenny led from start to finish in the replay and the goalkeeping of Deirdre Sutton prevented Kilkenny winning by a greater margin. At the end of the game the Cork players carried Ann Carroll, now in her twelfth inter-county season, off the field. Agnes Hourigan wrote in the Irish Press: Kilkenny gave a brilliant display in the opening half, being faster to the ball, and to the strike. Cork never gave up. They chased every ball but were not as accurate as usual in front of goal. Kilkenny clinched the issue with a goal by Ursula Grace in the 22nd minute.

Final stages

Drawn Final September 15 Kilkenny 3-8 Cork 4-5

 
MATCH RULES
50 minutes
Replay if scores level
Maximum of 3 substitutions

Replay October 6 Kilkenny 3-3 Cork 1-5

 
MATCH RULES
50 minutes
Replay if scores level
Maximum of 3 substitutions

See also
 All-Ireland Senior Hurling Championship
 Wikipedia List of Camogie players
 National Camogie League
 Camogie All Stars Awards
 Ashbourne Cup

References

External links
 Camogie Association
 All-Ireland Senior Camogie Championship: Roll of Honour
 Camogie on facebook
 Camogie on GAA Oral History Project
 Historical reports of All Ireland finals

All-Ireland Senior Camogie Championship
1974
All-Ireland Senior Camogie Championship
All-Ireland Senior Camogie Championship
All-Ireland Senior Camogie Championship
All-Ireland Senior Camogie Championship